NSB Class 67 is a three-car electric multiple unit operated by the Norwegian State Railways between 1953 and 1995. It was mainly used for local trains as well as branch lines. A total of 18 3-car units were delivered between 1953 and 1955. The motor cars were built by Norsk Elektrisk & Brown Boveri and Skabo while the centre cars were built by Strømmen and the end cars by Skabo.

External links
Entry at the Norwegian Railway Club
Entry at Jernbane.net 

67
Brown, Boveri & Cie multiple units
Vehicles introduced in 1953
15 kV AC multiple units